Greg Davis may refer to:

 Greg Davis (actor) (born 1993), American actor from New Orleans, Louisiana
 Greg Davis (American football coach) (born 1951), American football coach, former offensive coordinator of the Iowa Hawkeyes
 Greg Davis (Australian footballer) (born 1955), Australian rules footballer for Footscray
 Greg Davis (bowls) (born 1988), lawn bowler from Jersey
 Greg Davis (Canadian politician), member of the Legislative Assembly of New Brunswick, Canada
 Greg Davis (ice hockey) (born 1979), Canadian ice hockey player
 Greg Davis (Mississippi politician) (born 1966), mayor of Southaven, Mississippi and U.S. congressional candidate
 Greg Davis (musician) (born 1975), American electronic musician
 Greg Davis (placekicker) (born 1965), American football placekicker, former NFL player
 Greg Davis (rugby union) (1939–1979), Australian rugby union international player and captain
 Greg Davis, American musician best known as a member of the band Blood on the Saddle

See also
 Greg Davies (born 1968), British comedian